Selaginella tamariscina is a species of plant in the Selaginellaceae family, endemic to China, India, Japan, Korea, Philippines, Russia (Siberia), Taiwan, and northern Thailand. It is an evergreen perennial growing to 45 cm in height. It is often used as an herbal medicine, and has been used to treat gout and hyperuricemia.

Synonyms
 Lycopodioides tamariscina (P.Beauv.) H.S.Kung
 Lycopodium caulescens Wall. ex Hook. & Grev.
 Lycopodium involvens Sw.
 Lycopodium tamariscinum (P.Beauv.) Desv. ex Poir.
 Selaginella caulescens (Wall. ex Hook. & Grev.) Spring
 Selaginella involvens (Sw.) Spring
 Selaginella tamariscina var. tamariscina
 Selaginella veitchii W.R.McNab
 Stachygynandrum tamariscinum P.Beauv.

References

 Bull. Acad. Roy. Sci. Bruxelles 10(1): 136 1843.
 The Plant List
 Flora of China
 Plants for a Future
 

tamariscina